Kocēni is a village in Kocēni Parish, Valmiera Municipality in the Vidzeme region of Latvia.

Towns and villages in Latvia
Valmiera Municipality
Kreis Wolmar
Vidzeme